

219001–219100 

|-id=067
|  219067 Bossuet ||  || Jacques-Bénigne Bossuet (1627–1704), a French bishop and orator at the Cathedral of Meaux, is famous for his Discourse on Universal History (1681), written in a masterly French style || 
|}

219101–219200 

|-bgcolor=#f2f2f2
| colspan=4 align=center | 
|}

219201–219300 

|-bgcolor=#f2f2f2
| colspan=4 align=center | 
|}

219301–219400 

|-bgcolor=#f2f2f2
| colspan=4 align=center | 
|}

219401–219500 

|-bgcolor=#f2f2f2
| colspan=4 align=center | 
|}

219501–219600 

|-bgcolor=#f2f2f2
| colspan=4 align=center | 
|}

219601–219700 

|-bgcolor=#f2f2f2
| colspan=4 align=center | 
|}

219701–219800 

|-bgcolor=#f2f2f2
| colspan=4 align=center | 
|}

219801–219900 

|-bgcolor=#f2f2f2
| colspan=4 align=center | 
|}

219901–220000 

|-bgcolor=#f2f2f2
| colspan=4 align=center | 
|}

References 

219001-220000